Gerard Oliva Gorgori (born 7 October 1989) is a Spanish footballer who plays for Real Balompédica Linense as a forward.

Club career
Born in Riudecanyes, Tarragona, Catalonia, Oliva started his youth career in local UE Barri Santes Creus and Gimnàstic de Tarragona, and after a brief period with neighbouring CF Reus Deportiu, he made his senior debuts with CD Logroñés in the 2008–09 season, in Tercera División; however, he left the club in the following transfer window, due to financial problems.

In January 2009, Oliva moved abroad and joined Italian side Calcio Catania, being assigned to the Primavera squad. In July, he returned to his country, signing with CD Numancia and being assigned to the reserves in the fourth level. On 4 December of the following year, Oliva made his professional debut, playing the last 26 minutes of a 1–2 home loss against Real Betis, in the Segunda División championship.

On 21 June 2011, Oliva signed with another reserve team, Atlético Madrid B, in Segunda División B. Two seasons later, he joined SD Huesca, freshly relegated to the third level.

On 17 January 2014, it was confirmed that Oliva signed a six-month deal with Austrian Bundesliga side SV Josko Ried. He scored the winning goal in his first game for Ried in a 2–1 home victory over SC Wiener Neustadt on 8 February 2014.

On 27 August 2014, Oliva returned to his country, signing a one-year deal with Real Murcia in the third level. He continued to appear in that tier in the following years, representing SD Compostela, CE L'Hospitalet, CF Badalona, CD Atlético Baleares, Gimnàstic de Tarragona and Real Balompédica Linense, the latter in the new division called Primera División RFEF.

References

External links

1989 births
Living people
People from Baix Camp
Sportspeople from the Province of Tarragona
Spanish footballers
Footballers from Catalonia
Association football forwards
Segunda División players
Segunda División B players
Tercera División players
CD Logroñés footballers
CD Numancia B players
CD Numancia players
Atlético Madrid B players
SD Huesca footballers
Real Murcia players
SD Compostela footballers
CE L'Hospitalet players
CF Badalona players
CD Atlético Baleares footballers
Gimnàstic de Tarragona footballers
Real Balompédica Linense footballers
Austrian Football Bundesliga players
SV Ried players
Ekstraklasa players
MKS Cracovia (football) players
Spanish expatriate footballers
Spanish expatriate sportspeople in Austria
Spanish expatriate sportspeople in Poland
Expatriate footballers in Austria
Expatriate footballers in Poland